Vestaburg is an unincorporated community in Washington County, Pennsylvania, United States. Vestaburg has a post office, with ZIP code 15368, which opened on March 4, 1916.

References

Unincorporated communities in Washington County, Pennsylvania
Unincorporated communities in Pennsylvania